Dirhash is a feature of FreeBSD that improves the speed of finding files in a directory.  Rather than finding a file in a directory using a linear search algorithm, FreeBSD uses a hash table. The feature is backwards-compatible because the hash table is built in memory when the directory is accessed, and it does not affect the on-disk format of the filesystem, in contrast to systems such as Htree. An in-memory of space for new entries is also maintained, allowing addition of new entries without having to scan the directory to find free space.

Dirhash was implemented by Ian Dowse early in 2001 as an addition to UFS, operating in parallel with higher-level file system caching. It was imported into FreeBSD in July 2001. It was subsequently imported into OpenBSD in December 2003 and NetBSD in January 2005.

References 

Disk file systems
Hashing
FreeBSD